The Local Government Act 1933 was an Act of the Parliament of the United Kingdom that consolidated and revised existing legislation that regulated local government in England (except the County of London) and Wales. It remained the principal legislation regulating local government until the Local Government Act 1972 took effect in 1974.

Powers of local authorities
Although local authorities acquired few new powers or duties, the Act did include a few innovations:
One section dealt with custody of records, and led to the establishment of county record offices 
It became easier for local authorities to form joint committees where they had a common interest 
A council could acquire land outside of its area in order to perform its functions
County councils could agree to exchange areas of land to form more efficient boundaries
Rural and urban district councils, previously elected annually by thirds, could opt for elections of the whole council, triennially.

Administrative areas and local authorities
Although the 1933 Act did not create new local government areas, it repealed most of the Local Government Acts of 1888 and 1894, and parts of the Municipal Corporations Act 1882, and reestablished the existing councils and administrative areas.

Section 1 stated:
(1) For the purposes of local government, England and Wales (exclusive of London) shall be divided into administrative counties and county boroughs, and administrative counties shall be divided into county districts, being either non-county boroughs, urban districts or rural districts, and county boroughs and county districts shall consist of one or more parishes.
(2) Subject to any alteration of boundaries or the constitution of new authorities which may take effect after the passing of this Act--
(a) the administrative counties shall be the administrative counties which are named in Part I of the First Schedule to this Act;
(b) the county boroughs shall be the boroughs which are named in Part II of the First Schedule to this Act;
(c) the non-county boroughs shall be the boroughs which are named in Part III of the First Schedule to this Act;
(d) the urban districts shall be the urban districts other than boroughs existing at the passing of this Act;
(e) the rural districts shall be the rural districts existing at the passing of this Act; and
(f) the parishes shall be the urban parishes which at the passing of this Act are comprised in boroughs or urban districts, and the rural parishes which at the passing of this Act are comprised in rural districts.
(3) Every county borough shall, with respect to the functions which the council of the borough discharge, form a separate administrative area.

The term "non-county boroughs" was introduced in preference to "municipal borough" as county boroughs were also legally municipal boroughs. The councils for each of these various areas were to be known by the generic term of "local authorities" in this and subsequent legislation.

The actual titles of the councils remained the same:
X county council (or council of the county of X) for administrative counties
The mayor, aldermen and burgesses of the borough of Y (or (lord) mayor, aldermen and citizens of the city of Z) for boroughs
W urban district council (or urban district council of W)
V rural district council (or rural district council of V)

Rural parishes were governed by parish councils or parish meetings.

Local government areas listed in the Act
Administrative counties

(a) England (exclusive of London)

(b) Wales

County boroughs

(a) England

(b) Wales

Non-county boroughs

(a) England

(b) Wales

Amendment and repeal
The 1933 Act was amended by the Local Government Act 1958. The local authorities as defined in the Act, with the exception of rural parishes, were abolished in 1974, by the Local Government Act 1972, when most of the Act was repealed. Parts of the Act still have currency, however. For example, many council byelaws now in force are made under section 249 of the Act.

References

Notes

Sources
 Local Government Act 1933

United Kingdom Acts of Parliament 1933
Local government legislation in England and Wales
Boroughs of the United Kingdom